Brian Tucker is a Canadian writer, whose debut novel Big White Knuckles was a finalist for the Chapters/Books in Canada First Novel Award and the ReLit Award for Fiction in 2008.

The novel was published in 2007 by Vagrant Press. Originally from New Waterford, Nova Scotia, Tucker was living in Trout Brook, New Brunswick at the time of the novel's publication.

References

21st-century Canadian novelists
21st-century Canadian male writers
Canadian male novelists
People from New Waterford, Nova Scotia
Writers from Nova Scotia
Writers from New Brunswick
Living people
Year of birth missing (living people)